The Huntington-USC Institute on California and the West is an educational institute created in 2004 by a partnership between the Huntington Library and the University of Southern California. Its goal is to bring together writers, students, scholars, policy-makers, and historians to study the history of the American West and California, and to promote more extensive use of the Huntington Library's extensive materials on the subject.  The institute has sponsored conferences and research on subjects such as the impact of the Hollywood film industry and the "subterranean West".

References

External links
Huntington-USC Institute on California and the West official website

History institutes
Huntington Library
Institutes of the University of Southern California